Gator Golf is a children's miniature golfing game. It was released in 1994 by the American game company Milton Bradley. In the game, children take turns putting into the mouth of a motorized plastic alligator figure, which then flings the ball off its tail and spins around, creating a new challenge for the next player. Gator Golf'''s commercial tag line was "Gator Golf - what could be greater than playing a game of golf with a gator?" It was released again in 2008, then in 2009 under the "Elefun and Friends" banner. It was then re-released in 2019 by Goliath Games. The game was then re-released again in 2020 by Toy City in the UK and its name was "Gator Golfers".

HistoryGator Golf was invented by toymaker Robert B. Fuhrer who had also developed the 1990 game Crocodile Dentist. Fuhrer submitted his idea for Gator Golf (then known as Crocodile Dentist Golf'') to Milton Bradley in November 1992.  Phil Grant and Mike Meyers of Milton Bradley played a key role in developing the game.  Milton Bradley asked him to consider using a different animal in the game, such as a beaver or a dragon, but Fuhrer's original idea remained mostly intact. The game debuted at the 1994 American International Toy Fair, and became one of the most popular children's toys of the 1994 Christmas season.

The game was released again in 2008, without the spins (possibly to keep the game at a lower price than the original) and changing the color from green to orange. However, in 2012, the color was turned back to green (though the design of the gator from the 2008 version remained).

The game was released once again in 2019 by Goliath Games. The gator was given a complete redesign, with birds on its back to keep the score.

External links
 Gator Golf page at Goliath Games website

References

1990s toys
Milton Bradley Company games
Games and sports introduced in 1994